The 2014 QNet Open was a professional tennis tournament played on outdoor hard courts. It was the first and last edition of the QNet Open and was part of the 2014 ITF Women's Circuit, offering a total of $50,000 in prize money. It took place in New Delhi, India, on 17–23 November 2014.

Singles entrants

Seeds 

 1 Rankings as of 10 November 2014

Other entrants 
The following players received wildcards into the singles main draw:
  Prerna Bhambri
  Bhuvana Kalva
  Natasha Palha
  Sharon Sanchana Paul

The following players received entry from the qualifying draw:
  Kamonwan Buayam
  Shweta Rana
  Rishika Sunkara
  Wang Xiyao

The following player received entry into the singles main draw as a lucky loser:
  Vaniya Dangwal

Champions

Singles 

  Ivana Jorović def.  Barbara Haas 6–2, 6–2

Doubles 

  Liu Chang /  Lu Jiajing def.  Marina Melnikova /  Elise Mertens 6–3, 6–0

External links 
 2014 QNet Open at ITFtennis.com

2014 ITF Women's Circuit
2014 in Indian tennis
November 2014 sports events in Asia